Antonio di Marco Magliabechi (or Magliabecchi; 29 October 1633 - 4 July 1714) was an Italian librarian, scholar and bibliophile.

Biography
He was born at Florence, the son of a burgher named Marco Magliabechi, and Ginevra Baldorietta. His father died when Antonio was a young man, and he worked briefly in the studio of Matteo Roselli, but was apprenticed to a goldsmith in Ponto Vecchio. There he worked in this capacity until his fortieth year, until Michele Ermini, librarian to Cardinal de' Medici, recognized his academic ability and taught him Latin, Greek, and Hebrew.

In 1673 he became librarian to Cosimo III de' Medici, Grand Duke of Tuscany. Magliabechi became the central figure of literary life in Florence, and scholars of every nation sought his acquaintance and corresponded with him. Whilst this eminent post gave him considerable prominence, he is remembered more for his personal characteristics and his vast store of self-acquired learning. He was nicknamed the Enciclopedic, the animated Library, a literary glutton (Divoratore di Libri), and the most rational of bibliomaniacs, inasmuch as he read everything he bought. His own library consisted of 40,000 books and 10,000 manuscripts. His house literally overflowed with books; the stairways were lined with them, and they even filled the front porch. Many stories are told of his marvellous memory that was "like wax to receive and marble to retain."

In worldly matters Magliabechi was extremely negligent. Reputedly, he once even forgot to draw his salary for over a year. He wore his clothes until they fell from him, and thought it a great waste of time to undress at night, "life being so short and books so plentiful". He welcomed all inquiring scholars, provided they did not disturb him while at work. He had a hearty dislike for Jesuits. The story goes that one day in pointing out the Palazzo Riccardi to a stranger he said, "Here the new birth of learning took place," and then turning to the college of the Jesuits, "There they have come back to bury it."

Magliabecchi died at the age of 81, in 1714, at the monastery of Sta. Maria Novella. He left his books to the Grand Duke to be used as a public library; his fortune went to the poor. His library, known as the "Magliabechiana", was combined with the grand-ducal private library by Victor Emmanuel II of Italy in 1861, the two forming the core of the Biblioteca Nazionale Centrale Firenze.

Eccentricities
Magliabechi was known as an eccentric. He was a man of a most forbidding and savage aspect, and exceedingly negligent of his person. He refused to be waited upon. His diet was commonly three hard-boiled eggs, with a draught of water. Magliabechi did not care about personal hygiene and slept in his clothes. He had a small window in his door, through which he could see all those who approached him; and if he did not wish for their company, he would not admit them. He spent some hours in each day at the palace library; but is said never in his life to have gone farther from Florence than to Prato, whither he once accompanied Cardinal Henry Norris, librarian at the Vatican, to see a manuscript.

References

Further reading
Library Juice 8:5
Catholic Encyclopedia article
 M. Albanese, Magliabechi, Antonio. In: Dizionario Biografico degli Italiani, Volume LXVII, Roma: Istituto della Enciclopedia Italiana, 2007
 A. Mirto, Lettere di Antonio Magliabechi a Leopoldo de' Medici, Roma, aracne, 2012
 A. Mirto, Pietro Paolo Bosca: Lettere ad Antonio Magliabechi, "Studi secenteschi", LIV, 2013, pp. 260–333
 C. Viola, Vecchia e nuova erudizione: Muratori e Magliabechi, "Studi secenteschi", LIV, 2013, pp. 97–115

1633 births
1714 deaths
17th-century Italian people
Bibliophiles
Italian librarians
People from Florence